Gabriela Sabatini defeated Lindsay Davenport in the final, 6–3, 6–2, 6–4 to win the singles tennis title at the 1994 Virginia Slims Championships. It was her second Tour Finals singles title.

Steffi Graf was the defending champion, but lost in the quarterfinals to Mary Pierce.

Seeds

Notes:
  Magdalena Maleeva had qualified but withdrew due to rib stress fracture
  Mary Joe Fernandez had qualified but withdrew

Main draw

 NB: The Final was the best of 5 sets while all other rounds were the best of 3 sets.

Finals

See also
WTA Tour Championships appearances

References

External links
 Official results archive (ITF)
 Official results archive (WTA)

Championships - Singles, 1994 Wta Tour
Singles 1994